Sergei Yegorov is the name of:

 Sergei Viktorovich Yegorov (born 1973), Kazakhstani footballer who played for FC Bolat, FC Shakhter Karagandy, FC Energia Kamyshin, FC Uralan Elista, FC Baltika Kaliningrad and FC Anzhi Makhachkala
 Sergei Sergeyevich Yegorov (born 1975), Russian football functionary, president of FC Zelenograd
 Sergei Gennadyevich Yegorov (born 1983), Russian footballer with FC Arsenal Tula, FC Ural Sverdlovsk Oblast and FC Baltika Kaliningrad
 Sergei Yegorov (footballer, born 1959), Latvian footballer who played for Daugava Riga